MORA is the fifth studio album of Hungarian industrial nu metal band FreshFabrik. The album was released under the label of Hungarian record and book company Alexandra . Four videos were shot supporting MORA: "Stealing The Sun", "Woman", "Into The Light" and "Orpheus". MORA was honoured as the Best Domestic Modern Pop-Rock Album of 2011 at the 2012 Fonogram, Hungarian Music Awards.

Track listing
Ghosts
Fire
Stealing the Sun
Orpheus
Soul Emergency
Tramontana
Into The Light
Wonderland
Europa
Woman
Stealing the Sun (karaoke)

Personnel
The following people contributed to MORA:

FreshFabrik
Szabolcs Oláh - vocals & guitar
Levente Kovács - bass
András Szabó - drums
László Szvoboda - guitars, vocals

Additional musicians and production
Dávid Schram - mixing & mastering

References

External links
FreshFabrik UK Official Site
FreshFabrik Hungarian Site
Alexandra Hungarian Site

FreshFabrik albums
2011 albums